Kevin Villodres Medina (born 26 February 2001), simply known as Kevin, is a Spanish footballer who plays as a left winger for Portuguese club Gil Vicente FC, on loan from Málaga CF.

Club career
Born in Málaga, Andalusia, Kevin represented Málaga CF, CD 26 de Febrero and Sevilla FC as a youth. He made his senior debut with the reserves on 10 November 2019, coming on as a late substitute for Alberto Quintana in a 1–2 Tercera División away loss against CD Huétor Vega.

Kevin scored his first senior goal on 29 November 2020, netting the B's third in a 3–0 home win over Motril CF. He scored a brace in a 5–0 home routing of Melilla CD, and renewed his contract until 2023 on 4 March 2021.

Kevin made his first team debut on 16 August 2021, starting in a 0–0 home draw against CD Mirandés in the Segunda División. On 23 July 2022, he was loaned to Primeira Liga side Gil Vicente FC for the season.

References

External links
Málaga profile 

2001 births
Living people
Footballers from Málaga
Spanish footballers
Association football wingers
Segunda División players
Tercera División players
Tercera Federación players
Atlético Malagueño players
Málaga CF players
Primeira Liga players
Gil Vicente F.C. players
Spanish expatriate footballers
Spanish expatriate sportspeople in Portugal
Expatriate footballers in Portugal